Sternotomis kuntzeni is a species of beetle in the family Cerambycidae. It was described by Fiedler in 1939.

Subspecies
 Sternotomis kuntzeni kuntzeni Fiedler, 1939
 Sternotomis kuntzeni kamerunensis Fiedler, 1939

References

Sternotomini
Beetles described in 1939